The Dark Queen is the main antagonist of the Battletoads video game series by Rare introduced in the original Battletoads in 1991. Dark Queen is the nemesis of the protagonistic Battletoads. She is a mysterious mistress of evil magic and the supreme commander of a space army bent on galactic conquest. The character has received considerable attention due to her sex appeal.

Appearances

Origin
Other than the fact that she bares a striking resemblance to Jessica Rabbit, she is not the main source of inspiration. According to Kevin Bayliss, the character's design was based on Cassandra Peterson's iconic role as Elvira.

Character
The immortal Dark Queen is the ultimate enemy to the Battletoads, as she attempts to eliminate the 'Toads and Professor T. Bird, in order to stop them from hindering her plans to rule the universe. She is depicted as a sinisterily beautiful woman with raven big hair, who shows off a voluptuous body clad in a dominatrix-style black bathing suit with thigh boots. Throughout the games there have been several inconsistencies regarding her actual size; even though her height is stated to be 6 ft 0 in (182 cm) tall on her profile screen in the arcade game (which would mean she is actually smaller than the Battletoads), she normally appears to be of a tremendous size in the games, usually roughly four times the height of the 'Toads.  Her shifting size, however, may be an effect of her magic and her being six-feet-tall is her natural height. Throughout the series she usually appears to taunt the 'Toads during the cutscenes; despite her royal stature, she prefers to be no more cultured than the Battletoads themselves, due to the crude nature of her speech which consists primarily of surfer slang and offensive puns (such as calling them "cattle-loads" and "wartfeatures"). She leads a renegade army consisting primarily of anthropomorphic pigs and rats is usually fought as the end boss of the game. Her main sidekicks are initially Big Blag, General Vermin and Robo-Manus, later joined by General Slaughter, Karnath and Admiral Oink.

In Battletoads games
The Dark Queen is introduced in the first Battletoads game. In it, following her defeat by the Galactic Corporation at the Battle of Canis Major, she and her remaining forces have escaped to hide in the planet Ragnarok's World "in dark spaces between the stars." As Professor T. Bird and the Battletoads  Rash, Zitz and Pimple are escorting the Princess Angelica, daughter of the Terran Emperor, the Dark Queen (disguised as a belly dancer) suddenly strikes and kidnaps the Princess along with Pimple (or Rash and Pimple in the Game Boy version), taking them away in the enormous spaceship Gargantua to the planet Armagedda (Ragnarok's World). The other two Battletoads go after her to rescue the captives and eventually confront the Dark Queen at her Tower of Shadows. During the final boss fight, she only has one special move besides basic kicks, spinning until turning into a tornado and then attempting to hit the player (how much damage is done to the player is based on how fast she is spinning). After her defeat, the Dark Queen flees into space, "retreating into the shadowy margins of the galaxy to recoup her losses."

In Battletoads in Battlemaniacs, the returning Dark Queen has partnered with the vengeful computer engineer Silas Volkmire to kidnap Zitz and Michiko Tashoku, the daughter of the President of the Psicone Corporation, creators of the computer-generated portal Gamescape, intending to transform the entire world into Gamescape Kingdom over which they would rule together. In this game, she is wearing a red cape and wielding a snake-themed staff. The other two 'Toads showdown with the Dark Queen again, this time at her Dark Tower, During the boss fight, she teleports and attacks the players with magical projectiles from staff. After her defeat, she flees again "to the outer reaches of the Universe," vowing revenge.

In the crossover game Battletoads & Double Dragon, the Dark Queen teams up with the Shadow Boss, an original and exclusive Double Dragon final boss who was created by Rare because the designers did no research on the villainous Black Warriors gang. Together, they use a mysterious energy beam from outer space to render Earth's military might powerless and use a giant spaceship called the Colossus to take over the Earth. The Battletoads Rash, Zits, and Pimple join unlikely forces with the Double Dragons Billy and Jimmy Lee, to become the heroic squad known as The Ultimate Team, to once again foil her schemes. In this game, she is capable of transforming into a flame and moving across the floor, remaining untouchable by doing so, and can also attack by emerging from the flame and tossing fireballs. Once "beaten and humbled," she makes her escape into space, promising to return.

The Dark Queen comes back to antagonize the Battletoads in the largely plot-less Battletoads Arcade. In it, she was "sexed up a bit for the allegedly more mature arcade crowd," having her erect nipples visible through her outfit and a breast bounce effect. An in-game portrait also shows her hair spread out in a fashion much like Medusa's. During the gameplay parts, she only appears as a holographic projection in the third stage, where she is watching the boss fight between the 'Toads and Scuzz's Robo-Rat.

The Dark Queen was planned to be also featured in a planned Battletoads fighting game, but Rare scrapped the idea and ended up developing Killer Instinct instead.

She returns in the 2020 Battletoads reboot, albeit in a radically redesigned, desexualized, and fully-dressed appearance, completed with a posh English accent. This new approach to the famous villainess caused negative feedback from the fans of the Battletoads franchise, describing her as bland, off-brand, forgettable, downgraded, and "Tumblrized".

Other appearances
The Dark Queen also appears in the Battletoads tie-in comic printed in Nintendo Power, and in the games' abortive cartoon adaptation of which only the pilot episode was produced. The Xbox One version of Shovel Knight hints at possibility that this game's villain the Enchantress might be actually a form of the Dark Queen. A San Diego Comic-Con 2015-exclusive Battletoads compilation vinyl soundtrack with music by David Wise features a Dark Queen artwork drawn by Vice Magazine art editor Nick Gazin and she was also featured in the musical trailer "Rare Replay Opening Number".

Reception
The Dark Queen was well received by critics upon her introduction, having been twice nominated by Nintendo Power for the Nintendo Power Awards in the category villain of the year for 1991 and 1993. Dark Queen was included on UGO's 2008 list of the top 50 evil women in all media, and on Geek World's list of the greatest villains of the 8-bit era. In 2011, Complex ranked her as tenth on the list of "most diabolical video game she-villains" while Universo Online ranked her ninth on the list of ten most beautiful and deadly game villainesses. Ryan Bates of Game Revolution placed her fourth on his 2014 list of top "mean girls in gaming", stating that "though the Dark Queen is often noted for her sex appeal, she was one of the first antagonists to set the bar for villainesses in video games," having "showcased she can be as cruel and calculating as the men."

The Dark Queen particularly contrasted with Nintendo's Princess Peach, as, according to 64 Magazine, "in this game, the token female wasn't some bland princess pleading for rescue, but instead a leather clad dominatrix embarked on world domination." Alex Langley of Arcade Sushi called the Dark Queen the "breakdown character", noting that "in a time where princesses and queens were there to be kidnapped, the Dark Queen turned the depiction of video game matriarchy on its head and boldly declared that she'd be the one doing the kidnapping." UGO similarly also commented how "female villains were quite rare in the early days of video games, with the fairer sex usually reserved as kidnapped princesses in another castle."

According to UGO, "not only was the Dark Queen revolutionary, she was also dead sexy - possibly the hottest babe of the 8-bit era". UGO editors commented that the Battletoads series is "notorious for its insanely high difficulty, juvenile sense of humor and big-boobed antagonist" and adding that "the anger we felt at losing was only compounded by how hot and unattainable the Dark Queen was." Both Seanbaby and Geek World declared her the sexiest NES game character. GamesRadar's Jim Sterling featured her in a 2011 retrospective article featuring the sexy video game women of the sprite era.

Nerdist described the Dark Queen as a "sexed-up, dominatrix version of Natasha Fatale from Rocky & Bullwinkle." Others compared her to Jessica Rabbit and Scylla the witch from Hugo, in addition to Elvira. Jason F.C. Clarke of Topless Robot stated she "rivals Sins Elexis Sinclaire and Soulcaliburs Ivy for sheer cleavage" and Hardcore Gaming 101 described her as "basically a sexy Shredder". Gawker commented on the short-lived Battletoads cartoon how "Shredder had nothing on the Toads' sexy nemesis, the Dark Queen" and Meristation similarly stated that if they would have to choose between her and the Shredder there would be no contest. Complex noted that "where the TMNT had April O'Neil to flirt with, the most bodacious chick in the Battletoads universe is ironically the final boss who wants them all dead."

Previewing Battletoads in Battlemaniacs, GamePro praised the series' "cartoony, bizarre, radical style" and how the "gorgeous character sprites endow the 'Toads and their foes with personality and attitude," noting "the Dark Queen definitely has more hex appeal than ever." According to Charmaine Williams of WhatCulture, actually "the only thing [the cartoon] had going for it was the sexy Dark Queen. I guess if you think your show wont live to see a full season, might has well have a character with big boobs that lives in a penis shaped castle." Rare Gamer included the Dark Queen in their lists of Top 5 Reasons We Still Love Battletoads, Top 5 Classic Rare Villains Who Just Didn't Know When To Quit, and Top 5 Rare Femme Fatales (That Would Have Us Switching Sides). Luke McKinney and Matthew Moffitt of Cracked.com wrote she has "helped [the young gamers] manipulate themselves, and was just as physically mutated as the giant talking animals."

Raze described her as "one bitch who deserves to die" and the original game's ending where the Battletoads "simply just allow her to escape" was included on the 2010 list of ten biggest ending letdowns in video game history by Danny Gallagher of SPIKE. Requesting an "awesome remake" of Battletoads, Brian Cullen of Maxim wrote that "we would rain hot, repressed justice all over our consoles, just for a chance to hate-fight the foxy, infuriating Dark Queen"; Sean Velasco, lead designer of 2012's Double Dragon remake Double Dragon Neon, said: "I wanna high five Zitz and punch the Dark Queen in the gut!" Alternatively, Gaming Nexus' Cyril Lachel stated: "Forget reviving the Battletoads, all I want is a game based on the Dark Queen!"

References

External links
Dark Queen at Giant Bomb

Battletoads characters
Female characters in video games
Female video game villains
Fictional characters who can change size
Fictional witches
Fictional pirates in video games
Fictional warlords in video games
Microsoft antagonists
Queen characters in video games
Video game bosses
Video game characters introduced in 1991
Video game characters who can teleport
Video game characters who use magic
Video game characters with slowed ageing
Woman soldier and warrior characters in video games